Baron Göran Fredrik von Otter (4 August 1907 – 4 December 1988) was a Swedish diplomat and friherre, best known for his service in Berlin during World War II. Birgitta and Anne Sofie von Otter are von Otter's daughters; former Swedish Prime Minister Fredrik von Otter was his grandfather.

Biography

On the night between the 22 and 23 August 1942, Göran von Otter met Kurt Gerstein in a train from Warsaw to Berlin. Gerstein was an official at the "Institute of Hygiene" of the Waffen-SS and was on his way back from the Nazi concentration camp Treblinka. One day earlier, Gerstein had witnessed several hundred Jewish victims being murdered in the gas chambers at Bełżec extermination camp.
Gerstein and von Otter happened to be in the same compartment of the train. After the war, von Otter wrote about the encounter that Gerstein gave him a detailed report of what had happened at Belzec, seemed very disturbed by it and implored him to transmit this information to the Swedish authorities. Von Otter did talk with high-ranking officials at the Swedish Foreign Ministry. However, the information was not passed on to the Allies or to any other party.
After the end of the war, von Otter attempted to ascertain the whereabouts of Gerstein, but was not able to locate him before Gerstein's alleged suicide death on 25 July 1945 in the  Cherche-Midi military prison. This, combined with his inability to persuade those in the Swedish Foreign Ministry of the initial incident, contributed greatly to the depression he struggled with late in his life.

References

1907 births
1988 deaths
Barons of Sweden
Consuls-general of Sweden
Swedish nobility